This is a list of rivers in Morocco. This list is arranged north to south by drainage basin, with respective tributaries indented under each larger stream's name.

Atlantic Ocean 
Loukkos River
Sebu River (Guigou River)
Baht River
Oued Rkel
Ouegha River
Inaouen River
Lebne River
Fes River
Bou Regreg
Grou River
Korifla River
Oued Nefifikh
Oued Mellah
Rbia River
Tessaoute River
Lakhdar River
El-Abid River
Tensift River

Ourika River
Oued Ksob
Oued Tamri
Sous River
Massa River
Noun River (Assaka River)
Draa River
Dadès River
Ouarzazate River
Imini River

Mediterranean Sea 
Laou River
Rhîs River
Nekor River
Kert River
Río de Oro
Moulouya River
Za River
Msoun River
Melloulou River

Sahara Desert 
Oued Guir
Ziz River
Oued Rheris
Oued Todrha

See also 
List of rivers in Western Sahara

References 
Defense Mapping Agency, 1981
Defense Mapping Agency, 1981
 GEOnet Names Server

Morocco
Rivers